Emil Julius Gumbel (18 July 1891, in Munich – 10 September 1966, in New York City) was a German mathematician and political writer.

Gumbel specialised in mathematical statistics and, along with Leonard Tippett and Ronald Fisher, was instrumental in the development of extreme value theory, which has practical applications in many fields, including engineering and finance. In 1958, Gumbel published a key book, Statistics of Extremes, in which he derived and analyzed the probability distribution that is now known as the Gumbel distribution in his honor.

In the 1920s and early 1930s, Gumbel was considered unusual and highly controversial in German academic circles for his vocal support of left-wing politics and pacifism, and his opposition to Fascism. His influential writings about the politically motivated Feme murders made the case that the Weimar Republic was corruptly anti-leftist and anti-republican. Gumbel publicly opposed the Nazi Party and, in 1932, he was one of the 33 prominent signers of the Urgent Call for Unity.

Biography
Born to a prominent Jewish family in Württemberg, Gumbel graduated in mathematics from the University of Munich, completing his doctoral thesis on the topic of population statistics shortly before the outbreak of the First World War. After a short period of military service, he was discharged in 1915 on medical grounds and he joined the University of Berlin to work with the prominent Russian statistician Ladislaus von Bortkiewicz. From this time onwards he became much more politically active. He joined the Independent Social Democrat Party (USPD) in 1917, and became a prominent member of the pacifist New Fatherland League which was later renamed the German League for Human Rights (DLM). In January 1918, Gumbel took up a position with the electronics company Telefunken, researching sound transmitter waves, and he continued his political activities with the support of one of the firm's founders, Georg Count von Arco, a prominent member of the human rights movement. In 1922, Gumbel became Professor of Mathematical Statistics at the University of Heidelberg, where he soon found that combining academic work with politics was much more controversial, resulting in protests by students and faculty members, who were mostly right-wing, and strong criticism in the right-wing press.

Among the Nazis' most-hated public intellectuals, Gumbel was forced out of his position in Heidelberg in 1932. He then moved to France, where he taught at the École libre des hautes études in Paris, and in Lyon, as well as continuing his political activities and helping other refugees, until the German invasion of 1940. He then left Europe for the United States, where he taught at the New School for Social Research and Columbia University in New York City until his death in 1966.

When he died of lung cancer in 1966, Gumbel's papers were made a part of The Emil J. Gumbel Collection, Political Papers of an Anti-Nazi Scholar in Weimar and Exile. These papers include reels of microfilm that document his activities against the Nazis.

Influences
Emil Gumbel was strongly influenced from a young age by his uncle, Abraham Gumbel (1852-1930) with whom he had long conversations about political and social issues. The death of Abraham's son (Emil's cousin) in the First World War, is thought to have been a triggering factor in both Abraham and Emil's life-long commitment to pacifism.

During his time at the University of Munich (1910-1914), Gumbel was taught mathematics, economics and the social sciences by eminent scholars known to have liberal political views, including Alfred Pringsheim and Lujo Brentano. He also studied actuarial science and gained insurance qualifications and work experience (including a summer job with a London insurance company), before completing his doctorate dissertation under the supervision of extra-ordinary professor of statistics Friedrich Böhm in July 1914.

At the University of Berlin (1915-1922), Gumbel became closely associated with Georg Friedrich Nicolai, whose pacifist book, The Biology of War, was banned by the German Government. He also became acquainted with Albert Einstein, who was one of the founding members of the German League for Human Rights. Einstein was subsequently a strong supporter of Gumbel's professional career. Gumbel developed a deep professional bond with the prominent Russian statistician and economist Ladislaus von Bortkiewicz, who considered Gumbel to be "a gifted man [with an] uncommonly active mind". His recommendation strongly influenced Gumbel's subsequent appointment to professor of mathematics at the University of Heidelberg in 1922.

After the 1919 murder of prominent USPD member, Karl Liebknecht, who Gumbel greatly admired, there was strong criticism by journalist Kurt Tucholsky that the trial judge completely ignored evidence against the Nazi Brownshirts. Horrified, Gumbel ardently investigated many similar political murders that had occurred and published his findings in numerous publications and books, including Two Years of Murder in 1921, followed by Four Years of Political Murder in 1922, the deeply controversial Conspirators in 1924, The Armor of War of the Imperialistic States in 1928, which dealt with the causes of political murder, and Traitors fall victim to the Feme in 1929.

Gumbel was an admirer of the British intellectual and pacifist Bertrand Russell, though they never met. He translated some of Russell's work into German.

Family
In 1930 Gumbel married Marieluise Czettritz, who he first met at the DLM offices in the mid 1920s. She had two sons from her previous marriage, and retained custody of the youngest, Harald. She died of cancer in 1952.

Selected publications

References

Further reading

External links 
 
 
 
Emil Julius Gumbel Papers at University of Chicago Library
Emil J. Gumbel Collection at the Leo Baeck Institute, New York
Drawing depicting E. J. Gumbel

1891 births
1966 deaths
Scientists from Munich
German pacifists
German statisticians
Fellows of the American Statistical Association
Academic staff of Heidelberg University
Columbia University faculty
Jewish emigrants from Nazi Germany to France
Writers from Munich
Jewish emigrants from Nazi Germany to the United States
Mathematical statisticians